Ulhasnagar is a city located, just 26 km from Thane City in Thane district, Maharashtra, India. This city is a part of Mumbai Metropolitan Region managed by MMRDA. It had an estimated population of 506,098 at the 2011 Census. Ulhasnagar is a municipal city and the headquarters of the Tahsil bearing the same name. It has a suburban station on the Central line of the Mumbai Suburban Railway.

History
A suburban railway station was built in 1955. In January 1960, Ulhasnagar Municipality was formed, with Arjun K. Ballani as first chief, and a municipal council was nominated. In 1965, elections were first held in this council. In the late 1970s, Ulhasnagar was a town settled mainly by Sindhi Hindu refugees. Now this 28 square kilometre area has 389,000 people of Sindhi descent, the largest enclave of Sindhis in India. The town lies outside Mumbai city but within the Mumbai Conurbation. In 2010, the estimated population of Sindhi Hindus in Ulhasnagar was 400,000.

There are a number of criminal gangs in town working under the patronage of political parties. Also for many illegal building projects in 1990s, politicians started to charge money to look the other way.

Economy
The town covers an area of 13 square kilometers and is divided into 285 blocks. It is a centre for the production of rayon silk, dyes, ready-made garments, electrical / electronic appliances and confectionaries. The total length of roads and streets in the town is 352 kilometres. The town is served by underground and open-surface drainage, night soil being disposed of by septic tank latrines. The town has a protected water supply through MIDC. Sanctioned Water Quota at various tapping points is 112 MLD. Fire-fighting service is also available in the town. There are sixty private hospitals with a total bed-strength of 840 beds, three government hospitals with total bed-strength of 356 beds, 255 dispensaries / clinics, 100 RMP and a family planning centre.

Ulhasnagar has some small businesses manufacturing denims. Some of the manufacturers export jeans worldwide from Ulhasnagar. The city is also known for its furniture market, cloth market and electronic market.

Demographics

According to the 2011 Census of India, Ulhasnagar had a population of 506,098. Ulhasnagar is the 22nd biggest city in Maharashtra and 88th in the country. Males constituted 53% of the population and females 47%. There are about four lakh Sindhi-speaking Hindus in Ulhasnagar. Sindhis migrated to Ulhasnagar after the partition of India.

Education
Educational facilities are provided by 129 primary schools, 56 secondary schools, 9 higher secondary schools, 3 colleges and 2 technical colleges.

Smt. Chandibai Himmatmal Mansukhani College (C. H. M. College), established in 1965, has five college buildings:
Principal K M Kundnani Pharmacy Polytechnique
Institute of Technology
Dr L. H. Hiranandani College of Pharmacy
H and G H Mansukhani Institute of Management
Nari Gursahani Law College

Ulhasnagar Girls College, started in 1961, later converted to R K Talreja College.

Nari Gursahani Law College, an undergraduate law college affiliated to the University of Mumbai, is located in Ulhasnagar.

Pharmacy Infoline

References

External links

 
Talukas in Maharashtra
Cities in Maharashtra